Faisal bin Fahd Al Saud (Arabic:فيصل بن فهد بن عبدالله بن محمد ال سعود) is a Saudi Arabian businessman and a member of the House of Saud.

Early life and education
Prince Faisal is the son of Fahd bin Abdullah and is a great-grandson of Mohammed bin Abdul Rahman, half-brother of King Abdulaziz. He has a bachelor's degree in political science from King Saud University, and a master's degree in management, public policy and communication in the area of administration from Emerson College.

Career
Prince Faisal is a businessman and is the chairman, CEO and founder of F6 Holdings and also founded FAMA Holdings in 1993, a Saudi Arabia-based marketing and investment company. He claimed that he was close to purchasing a 50% share of Liverpool F.C. for a price of $250 to $450 million in 2009.

Personal life
He is married to Nouf, the daughter of Mutaib bin Abdullah Al Saud and granddaughter of former King, Abdullah of Saudi Arabia and has two children from this marriage. His former wife is Ghana bint Khalid bin Faisal Al Saud and has three children from that marriage, three sons and two daughters.

Ancestry

References

21st-century Saudi Arabian businesspeople
King Saud University alumni
Emerson College alumni
Saudi Arabian princes
Saudi Arabian billionaires